Virginia Gutiérrez (born 27 November 1928) is a Mexican actress. She was married to actor Luis Gimeno until his death in 2017. She is one of the last surviving stars from the Golden Age of Mexican cinema.

Selected filmography
Abismos de amor (1961)
La insaciable (1961)
Destino (1963)
La sombra del pecado (1966)
Vértigo (1966)
Incertidumbre (1967)
Obsesión (1967)
Cynthia (1968)
La familia (1969)
Aventura (1970)
Aquí está Felipe Reyes (1972)
La señora joven (1972)
Ha llegado una intrusa (1974)
Rina (1977)
El cielo es para todos (1979)
Soledad (1980)
Vanessa (1982)
Principessa (1984)
María Mercedes (1992)
Bajo un mismo rostro (1995)
Huracán (1997)
El Privilegio de Amar (1998)
La Otra (2002)
Destilando Amor (2007)

References

External links

1928 births
Living people
Mexican telenovela actresses